Dean Lewis Grant Loaney (born 21 October 1987) is an Australian pop singer-songwriter. He is best known for his 2016 single "Waves", which was certified 7× platinum in Australia in 2019, and his 2018 single "Be Alright", which reached number one in Australia and was certified platinum within four weeks of release, eventually reaching 11× platinum in Australia and multi-platinum worldwide, including double platinum in the United States.

Lewis released his debut studio album, A Place We Knew, in 2019 and his second, The Hardest Love, in 2022.

Career

2016–2017: Career beginnings and Same Kind of Different

Lewis was inspired to pursue music after watching a live Oasis DVD in 2005. Lewis says "I remember watching Liam Gallagher walk out with this hat and red jacket and watching him with Noel, they were just the coolest guys ever. I spent the next five years watching every Oasis video – Noel Gallagher basically taught me how to write songs."

Lewis signed his recording contract with Specific Music in 2014, and a major contract with Island Records and Universal Music Australia in March 2016. Lewis released his debut single "Waves" on 30 September 2016 which peaked at number 12 on the Australian ARIA Charts. The song was featured in a number of American television shows such as Suits, Greys Anatomy, Valor, Riverdale, All American, Shadowhunters: The Mortal Instruments and Magnum P.I.. The song has since been certified 7× Platinum by ARIA.

Lewis released "Need You Now" in April 2017 and his debut extended play Same Kind of Different on 12 May 2017 which peaked at number 27 on the ARIA Album Charts. Lewis received five ARIA Award nominations at the ARIA Music Awards of 2017. "Lose My Mind" and "Chemicals" were also released as singles from the EP and have been certified Platinum and Gold respectively.

2018–2020: A Place We Knew and collaborations

In June 2018, Lewis released "Be Alright". The single reached number one in Australia for five consecutive weeks, becoming his first chart-topper in the country, and has been certified eight times platinum in Australia. It also reached number one in Belgium, top five in New Zealand, Sweden and Ireland, top 10 in the Netherlands and Switzerland, top 20 in the United Kingdom and Scotland, top 30 in the United States and number one in the Billboard Adult pop chart. In January 2019, Lewis released "7 Minutes". Lewis released his debut studio album A Place We Knew on 22 March 2019. Lewis performed "Be Alright" and "Waves" at the 2019 AFL Grand Final. In 2019, Lewis signed with WME for representation in all areas.

Lewis released a single in collaboration with Dutch DJ/producer Martin Garrix on 31 October 2019 called "Used to Love". Regarding the collaboration with Garrix, Lewis explains that "Since my career began, collaborations never felt like something I saw myself pursuing. As a songwriter, who also sings, the entire concept just felt foreign. Until I met Martin. We spent about a week together locked behind closed doors in Amsterdam working on a song, which thought might end up be sung by someone else. But as the track progressed is started to sound a lot like me, but also very Martin. It's a real collaboration with a guy who's now become a great friend". An acoustic version of the song was released in 2020.

2022–present: The Hardest Love

On 5 March 2021, Lewis released the single "Falling Up". Lewis stated the song is about "being online and focusing on that one negative comment in a sea of good".

On 22 October 2021, Lewis released "Looks Like Me", which was inspired by a personal relationship where an ex was "hanging" with a guy that she said looked like Lewis. This was followed by "Hurtless" on 1 April 2022. On 2 September 2022 he released the single "How Do I Say Goodbye".

Discography

 A Place We Knew (2019)
 The Hardest Love (2022)

Awards and nominations

ARIA Music Awards
The ARIA Music Awards is an annual awards ceremony that recognises excellence, innovation, and achievement across all genres of Australian music. Lewis has won three awards from 16 nominations.

|-
! scope="row" rowspan="5"| 2017
| rowspan="3"| "Waves"
| Best Pop Release
| 
|-
| Breakthrough Artist
| 
|-
| Song of the Year
| 
|-
| Michael Jones for Dean Lewis' "Waves"
| Best Video
| 
|-
| John Castle for Dean Lewis' "Lose My Mind"
| Engineer of the Year
| 
|-
! scope="row" rowspan="5"| 2018
| rowspan="3"| "Be Alright"
| Best Male Artist
| 
|-
| Best Pop Release
|  
|-
| Song of the Year
| 
|-
| Jessie Hill and Dean Lewis – "Be Alright"
| Best Video
| 
|-
| 2017 National Tour
| Best Australian Live Act
| 
|-
! scope="row" rowspan="4"| 2019
| rowspan="3"| A Place We Knew
| Album of the Year
| 
|-
| Best Male Artist
| 
|-
| Best Pop Release
| 
|-
| "7 Minutes"
| Song of the Year
| 
|-
! scope="row" rowspan="1"| 2021
| rowspan="1"| "Falling Up"
| Song of the Year
| 
|-
! scope="row" rowspan="1"| 2022
| "Hurtless"
| Song of the Year
| 
|-
|}

APRA Awards
The APRA Awards are held in Australia and New Zealand by the Australasian Performing Right Association to recognise songwriting skills, sales and airplay performance by its members annually. Lewis has won three awards from eight nominations.

|-
! scope="row" rowspan="2"| 2018
| rowspan="2"| "Waves"
| Pop Work of the Year
| 
|-
| Most Played Australian Work
| 
|-
! scope="row" rowspan="4"| 2019
| rowspan="2"| "Be Alright"
| Pop Work of the Year
| 
|-
| Song of the Year
| 
|-
| Himself
| Breakthrough Songwriter of the Year
| 
|-
| Himself
| Outstanding International Achievement Award
| 
|-
! scope="row" rowspan="2"| 2020
| rowspan="2"| "7 Minutes"
| Most Performed Australian Work of the Year
| 
|-
| Most Performed Pop Work of the Year
| 
|-
! scope="row" rowspan="3"| 2021
| rowspan="2"| "Used to Love" (with Martin Garrix)
| Most Performed Australian Work of the Year
| 
|-
| Most Performed Dance Work of the Year
| 
|-
| "Be Alright"
| Most Performed Australian Work Overseas
| 
|-
! scope="row"| 2022
| "Falling Up"
| Most Performed Most Performed Alternative Work
| 
|-
|}

MTV Europe Music Awards
The MTV Europe Music Awards is an award presented by Viacom International Media Networks to honour artists and music in pop culture.

|-
! scope="row"| 2018
| Himself
| rowspan="2"| Best Australian Act
| 
|-
! scope="row"| 2019
| Himself
| 
|}

National Live Music Awards
The National Live Music Awards (NLMAs) are a broad recognition of Australia's diverse live industry, celebrating the success of the Australian live scene. The awards commenced in 2016.

|-
! scope="row"| 2018
| Himself
| Best Live Act of the Year – People's Choice
| 
|}

References

External links

 

1987 births
21st-century Australian singers
ARIA Award winners
APRA Award winners
Australian pop singers
Musicians from Sydney
Living people